The 2015–16 Ottawa Senators season was the 24th season of the Ottawa Senators of the National Hockey League (NHL). The Senators, along with all other Canadian teams, failed to make the playoffs. A major trade was made during the season to bring Dion Phaneuf to the Senators and improve the team defence, but the team was not able to make a run to secure a playoff spot. Two significant faults in the team were noted by the media: the club allowed 247 goals, third-highest in the league. Secondly, the team's penalty-killing unit ranked 29th in the league. One day after the regular season, general manager (GM) Bryan Murray stepped down and assistant GM Pierre Dorion became GM. Head coach Dave Cameron and the coaching staff were fired two days later.

Off-season
Leading up to the off-season, the media frequently speculated about what the Ottawa Senators would and could do with their surplus of goaltenders. They had recently signed Andrew Hammond, who had had an outstanding 2014–15 season, to a three-year contract and college graduate Matt O'Connor to an entry-level contract. They already had starter Craig Anderson, who was signed until the end of the 2017–18 season, and backup Robin Lehner, considered to be an outstanding future starter, who was signed until the end of the 2016–17 season, and prospect Chris Driedger in the minors.

The logjam at the goaltending position was resolved on June 26, when general manager Bryan Murray completed a trade that saw Robin Lehner and forward David Legwand go to the Buffalo Sabres in exchange for the 21st overall pick (acquired by Buffalo from the New York Islanders in the Matt Moulson-Thomas Vanek trade) in the 2015 NHL Entry Draft. The Senators would use the pick to select right winger Colin White, who played for the USA Hockey National Team Development Program's under-18 team. White is committed to attend Boston College beginning in the fall of 2015. The inclusion of Legwand in the trade was done to free up salary cap space to re-sign several players.

On June 27, Murray completed another trade, sending defenceman Eric Gryba to the Edmonton Oilers in exchange for prospect forward Travis Ewanyk and a fourth-round 2015 draft pick, 107th overall, which the Senators used to select defenceman Christian Wolanin of the Muskegon Lumberjacks in the United States Hockey League (USHL). Wolanin will play for the University of North Dakota in the 2015–16 season.

On July 7, the Senators re-signed Luke Richardson to a one-year contract extension to remain head coach of their American Hockey League (AHL) affiliate, the Binghamton Senators, for the 2015–16 season. Richardson has been head coach of Binghamton since the 2010–11 season. In his first season at the helm, he led Binghamton to a 44–24–1–7 record, placing them fourth in the Eastern Conference. The team would end up winning the 2011 Calder Cup.

On July 26, an arbitrator awarded RFA right-winger Alex Chiasson a one-year contract worth $1.2 million. TSN Hockey Insider Frank Seravalli reported that Chiasson asked for a $2.475 million in his hearing that occurred on July 23 while the Senators countered with a $1 million offer.

On August 3, an arbitrator awarded RFA left-winger Mike Hoffman a one-year contract worth $2 million. Hoffman submitted a request for a one-year contract worth $3.4 million while the Senators offered a one-year, $1.75 million contract.

On September 5, the Canadian Press reported Senators defenceman Chris Phillips had suffered a major setback in his return to action after having back surgery back in April 2015. Phillips confirmed the report by informing Ottawa Sun sports columnist Bruce Garrioch that he cracked a disc in his back and there is currently no timetable for his return.

On September 17, the Senators announced that Daniel Alfredsson had returned to the organization. He will be the team's senior advisor of hockey operations. He reports to Bryan Murray.

Pre-season 
The Ottawa Senators played an eight-game preseason schedule beginning on Monday, September 21, 2015, and finishing on Saturday, October 3, 2015. The schedule featured split squad games against the Toronto Maple Leafs and home-and-home series against the Buffalo Sabres and Montreal Canadiens. It also featured a game against the Carolina Hurricanes taking place in St. John's, Newfoundland and Labrador.

Regular season 
The Senators began their season on the road in Buffalo, against the Sabres at the First Niagara Center. The home opener took place at the Canadian Tire Centre on October 11, 2015, against the Montreal Canadiens. The team concluded the home part of their schedule on April 7, 2016, against the Florida Panthers. Their final game of the regular season took place on April 9, 2016, at TD Garden in Boston.

On Sunday, October 11, 2015, rookie goaltender Matt O'Connor made his NHL debut against the Montreal Canadiens in a 3–1 loss. The goaltender for the Canadiens that night was rookie goaltender Mike Condon. This marked the first time that two NHL rookie goaltenders made their NHL debuts in the same game since October 14, 1967 when Wayne Rutledge of the Los Angeles Kings faced Doug Favell of the Philadelphia Flyers.

In February 2016, the Senators and Toronto Maple Leafs made a sensational trade of nine players and a draft pick. The Senators acquired Toronto captain Dion Phaneuf, plus Matt Frattin and three prospects, in exchange for Jared Cowen, Colin Greening, Milan Michalek, prospect Tobias Lindberg and a second-round 2017 draft pick. The two rival teams interests coincided for a rare trade between the two. The Maple Leafs wished to trade Phaneuf to rid the team of his contract. Similarly, the Senators wanted to move Cowen and Greening and Michalek. After the trade, Cowen revealed he had requested a trade; he had become a regular healthy scratch for the team. Greening had lost his NHL job, but had a one-way contract, and Michalek had a relatively high $4 million per season contract. Frattin was not transferred from the AHL Toronto Marlies to Binghamton, he remained with the Marlies on a loan.

Playoffs 
The Senators failed to qualify for the Stanley Cup playoffs, after being eliminated on March 30, 2016.

Standings

Schedule and results

Pre-season

Regular season

Players

Statistics
Final stats 
Scoring

Goaltenders

†Denotes player spent time with another team before joining the Senators.  Stats reflect time with the Senators only.
‡No longer with team.
Bold/italics denotes team leader in that category.

Awards

Milestones

Records

Transactions

Draft picks

Below are the Ottawa Senators' selections at the 2015 NHL Entry Draft, held on June 26–27, 2015, at the BB&T Center in Sunrise, Florida. The day before the draft, the Senators traded goaltender Robin Lehner and David Legwand to the Buffalo Sabres to pick up a second first-round pick. On the second day of the draft, the Senators traded with the New Jersey Devils, moving up from the 42nd overall pick to the 36th overall pick to get Gabriel Gagne. The Senators then traded Eric Gryba to the Edmonton Oilers to pick up a player and the fourth-round pick of the Toronto Maple Leafs (107th overall) to select Christian Wolanin.

Draft notes

 The New York Islanders' first-round pick went to the Ottawa Senators as the result of a trade on June 26, 2015 that sent Robin Lehner and David Legwand to Buffalo in exchange for this pick.
Buffalo previously acquired this pick as the result of a trade on October 27, 2013 that sent Thomas Vanek to New York in exchange for Matt Moulson, a second-round pick in 2015 and this pick (being conditional at the time of the trade). The condition – Buffalo will receive a first-round pick in 2014 or 2015 at New York's choice – was converted on May 22, 2014 when the Islanders elected to keep their 2014 first-round pick.
 The New Jersey Devils' second-round pick went to the Ottawa Senators as the result of a trade on June 27, 2015 that sent Dallas' second-round pick in 2015 (42nd overall) and a conditional fourth-round pick in 2015 or 2016 to New Jersey in exchange for this pick.
 The Ottawa Senators' third-round pick went to the Edmonton Oilers as the result of a trade on March 5, 2014 that sent Ales Hemsky to Ottawa in exchange for a fifth-round pick in 2014 and this pick.
 The Pittsburgh Penguins' fourth-round pick went to the Ottawa Senators as the result of a trade on June 27, 2015 that sent Eric Gryba to Edmonton in exchange for Travis Ewanyk and this pick.
Edmonton previously acquired this pick as the result of a trade on June 27, 2015 that sent Martin Marincin to Toronto in exchange for Brad Ross and this pick.
Toronto previously acquired this pick as the result of a trade on February 25, 2015 that sent Daniel Winnik to Pittsburgh in exchange for Zach Sill, a second-round pick in 2016 and this pick.
 The Ottawa Senators' sixth-round pick went to the Carolina Hurricanes as the result of a trade on December 18, 2014 that sent Jay Harrison to Winnipeg in exchange for this pick. Winnipeg previously acquired this pick as the result of a trade on June 28, 2014 that sent a seventh-round pick in 2014 to Ottawa in exchange for this pick.

References

Ottawa Senators seasons
Ottawa Senators season, 2015-16
2010s in Ottawa
Ottawa